Cheer Up is the only studio album by Plexi, released on Sub Pop on October 8, 1996.

Overview
The packaging is an elaborate fold-out design, encased by a slide-off black external slipcase.  There are three large photos of band members preening in front of bathroom mirrors; there is also "BYE PLEXI & PALS (adios, amigos)" written on one of the mirrors with lipstick in guitarist Michael Barragan's handwriting. Though "Star Star" shares a title with a 1973 Rolling Stones song (the uncensored title of the Stones' song is actually "Starfucker"), it is not a cover. "Peel" and "Magnet" are re-recorded versions of songs from prior Plexi EPs.  "Peel" was given a radically different 2nd half with lyrics, instead of the instrumental noise coda called "He" with which it had previously ended. After a few minutes of reverb-heavy, hypnotic droning about how "she can't stand her hair, she can't stand her face," "Peel" now had a chorus of, "She was gonna swing/ She was gonna swing from her neckbone..." "Bunny" is a 2-minute ambient segue apparently based on a sampled loop of an orchestra, with sounds of explosions in the distance; it concludes with a muffled, echoing scream of "We're gonna die..."  Barragan handled the vocals on "56", a song said to be inspired by his love of numerology; the album's sleeve also had cryptic "23" artwork on it.

In the liner notes, Barragan thanks the NHRA in the liner notes. The band as a whole thanks the L.A. Free Clinic, Dave Navarro, "and of course, the vagina."

Promotional copies came in a plain black sleeve with a photo of the band, and a removable mini foldout poster; the poster contained Plexi's discography to date, and a mostly false biography detailing their meeting at a Taoist retreat. (This in-joke is possibly continued via the band's publishing company, which was entitled Three Pious Egoists.)

Reissue, video, singles
Cheer Up was re-released on CD and cassette on July 29, 1997, as a joint release by Sub Pop/Lava/Atlantic (the vinyl LP version remains in print solely on Sub Pop). The "23" rune design on the CD itself was slightly changed in size and color, but overall, the packaging remained very faithful to the original design.

A video was shot for "Forest Ranger," featuring the band cavorting in a bathtub and in the studio; it aired a few times on MTV's 120 Minutes in September '97.  (This song was slightly remixed by Tom Lord-Alge for radio play on the reissue.) "Forest Ranger" was also used in the movie Book of Shadows: Blair Witch 2 in 2000, but did not appear on the soundtrack album.

"Roller Rock Cam" was released as a 1-track promotional CD single to radio stations. In 1997, the promotional Mountains EP was released.  It featured the Cheer Up version of "Mountains," plus live recordings of "Forest Ranger," "Change" and "Simple Man." "Dimension" appeared on Spring Lineup: A Compilation of Sub Pop's Heavy Hitters in early 1997. "Bunny" appeared on Brine: The Antisurf Soundtrack in 1997.

Track listing
All songs written by Plexi.
"Forest Ranger" – 4:01
"Dimension" – 2:25
"Roller Rock Cam" – 3:08
"Peel" – 5:02
"Dayglo" – 3:09
"Ordinary Things" – 4:01
"Bunny" – 2:08
"Change" – 2:58
"Fourget" – 2:20
"Mountains" – 3:01
"Magnet" – 2:30
"56" – 2:04
"Star Star" – 3:58

Personnel
Plexi
 Michael Angelos – vocals, bass
 Michael Barragan – guitar, noises, Minimoog, Rhodes 88, vocals on "56"
 Norm Block – drums, percussion

Additional
 Melora Creager – cello on "Ordinary Things", "Star Star"
 Paul Roessler – keyboards on "Dayglo" and various other sounds
 Jonathan Poneman – executive producer
 Jeff Kleinsmith – art direction / design
 Robert Sebree, Derrick Ion – photography

References

External links
 CMJ album review
 Outer Sound album review
 Album review by Rice Univ.'s The Thresher newspaper
 Review by Section 3
 Jack Endino's review (under "3/97" section)

1996 debut albums
Plexi albums
Atlantic Records albums
Sub Pop albums